Chacewater is a village and civil parish in Cornwall, England, UK. The hamlets of Carnhot, Cox Hill, Creegbrawse, Hale Mills, Jolly's Bottom, Salem, Saveock, Scorrier, Todpool,  Twelveheads and Wheal Busy are in the parish. The electoral ward is called Chacewater & Kenwyn. At the 2011 census a population of 3,870 was quoted.

Village
Chacewater sits in a valley between hills separating it from the villages of Threemilestone, Scorrier and St Day. Nearby is Wheal Busy, the Poldice Valley and the Coast to Coast cycle route. The village has a pub and a club, the Chacewater Literary Institute. There are also a health centre, primary school, village hall and small selection of shops.

A free monthly magazine What's on in Chacewater reached its 200th issue in July 2007. It lists events and activities, such as the Football Club, a Cricket Club, a Bowling Club, the Chacewater Old Cornwall Society, the Chacewater Players, the Carnival (held in August), the Blind Club and a Women's Institute. The Kernow Microscopical Society meets in Chacewater.

Churches
The Anglican church is dedicated to St Paul; it was built in 1828 and rebuilt (apart from the tower) in 1892 by Edmund H. Sedding. The stonework is partly of granite and partly of Polyphant stone: the interior is lofty and the walls unplastered.

On 29 April 1880 a new organ was installed, for £120, in the Methodist Chapel by Mr Hele of Hele & Co, Plymouth.

Economy and transport
Chacewater railway station was opened by the West Cornwall Railway on 25 August 1852 but long since closed. The station closed to passengers on 5 October 1964 but continued to be served by goods traffic for many years, latterly for Blue Circle Cement. The Penzance bound platforms can still be seen, complete with a much altered station building. Great Western Railway and CrossCountry services run through the station on the Cornish Main Line. There are two Nursery Gardens in Chacewater; Sunny Corner Nurseries  and Roseland House Nursery, which holds a National Collection of Clematis viticella cultivars and of Lapageria rosea, the Chilean Bellflower. Twelveheads Press, an independent publishing company, is based in Chacewater. It is best known for the Cornish Heritage series but also publishes transport and mining books.

Notable people
Notable people born in Chacewater include Jonathan Hornblower the steam pioneer, Matthew Paul Moyle the meteorologist and geologist, and Andrew Ketcham Barnett, Mayor of Penzance and president of the Royal Geological Society of Cornwall.
(See also :Category:People from Chacewater.)

Gallery

See also

 Killifreth Mine – a former mine nearby
 Wheal Busy – a nearby disused metalliferous mine formerly called Chacewater mine
 Wheal Jane – a nearby disused tin mine

References

External links

 
 

Villages in Cornwall
Civil parishes in Cornwall